Costinha is a Portuguese nickname. It may refer to:

Costinha (humorist) (1923–1995), born Lírio Mário da Costa, Brazilian actor and showman
Paulo Costinha (born 1973), former Portuguese football goalkeeper
Costinha (born 1974), born Francisco José Rodrigues da Costa Júnior, former Portuguese football midfielder
Costinha (footballer, born 1992), born João José Pereira da Costa, Portuguese football forward
Costinha (footballer, born 1994), born Pedro Miguel Neves da Costa, Portuguese football defender
Costinha (footballer, born 2000), born João Pedro Loureiro da Costa, Portuguese football rightback